Neon Joe, Werewolf Hunter is an American television series that originally ran as a five episode mini-series on Adult Swim, created by and starring Jon Glaser. The series originally aired consecutively each night between December 7, 2015 and December 11, 2015. Produced by PFFR, the same production company used for Glaser's other projects Delocated and Jon Glaser Loves Gear. The first season was filmed in and around Palisades, New York.

Glaser stated in a November 2015 interview that the series could go beyond just a mini-series if enough interest is generated. Turner issued a press release on May 12, 2016 confirming that Neon Joe, Werewolf Hunter would be returning for another season.

Season 2 premiered on May 22, 2017, running a new episode each night until its conclusion on May 26, 2017.

Main cast
 Jon Glaser as Neon Joe
 Steve Little as Cleve Menu
 Scott Adsit as Sonny Cocoa (Season 1)
 Steve Cirbus as Sheriff Dalton (Season 1)
 Stephanie March as Mayor Carol Blanton (Season 1)
 Edoardo Ballerini as Vance Dontay (Season 2)
 Godfrey as Plaid Jeff (Season 2)
 Shannon O'Neill as Ashley (Season 2)
 Aleks Shaklin as Yuri (Season 2)
 Dolly Wells as Archibald Scoop (Season 2)

Series overview

Season 1 (2015)

Season 2 (2017)

References

External links
Official site

2015 American television series debuts
2017 American television series endings
2010s American comedy television miniseries
Television series by PFFR
Adult Swim original programming
English-language television shows
Television series by Williams Street